Dindigul Junction railway station (station code: DG) is a junction railway station serving the city of Dindigul in Tamil Nadu, India. The station is a part of the Madurai railway division of the Southern Railway zone. It acts as an important junction point and most of the trains halt at Dindigul Junction.

History
Dindigul was major junction point right from metre-gauge era in Great South Indian Railway. Metre-gauge routes to Coimbatore Junction railway, Tiruchirappalli Junction and Madurai Junction. In 1990s, the first broad-gauge line was established by Karur and Madurai broad-gauge track. 

The line between Madurai and Dindigul was a metre-gauge and broad-gauge parallel lines. After gauge conversion between Chennai Egmore and Madurai, Palani route was the sole metre-gauge section in the entire western Tamil Nadu. Around 2012, Dindigul–Palani section was converted into broad gauge, Chennai Palani Express commenced its service. The Dindigul to Palani railway line was electrified in 2022.

Location and layout
The Dindigul Junction is located on the eastern side of the city adjacent to the city's SIDCO industrial estate. The station bears the intersection of four branching railway lines and the next nearest train stations are:
 Ambathurai railway station (South)
 Tamaraipadi railway station (East)
 Akkaraippatti railway station (West)
 Eriodu railway station (North)

Madurai Airport is the nearest airport.

Lines
BG electrified double line towards Madurai
BG electrified double line towards Trichy
BG electrified single line towards Karur
BG electrified single line towards Pollachi

References

External links
 

Madurai railway division
Railway stations in Dindigul district
Railway junction stations in Tamil Nadu
Dindigul